Bobby or Bobbie is a masculine and feminine hypocorism, given name and occasional nickname. It is usually a variant of Robert (male) or Roberta (female). It can also be short for the male name Roberto. The female version is also sometimes spelled "Bobbi" or "Bobi".

"Bobby" is a diminutive of "Bob", itself a diminutive which most likely originated from the hypocorism Rob, short for Robert. Rhyming names were popular in the Middle Ages, so Richard became Rick, Hick, or Dick, William became Will or Bill, and Robert became Rob, Hob, Dob, Nob, or Bob.

People

Male
Bobby Abreu (born 1974), Venezuelan-American Major League Baseball player
Bobby Äikiä (1995–2006), Swedish boy murdered by his mother and stepfather
Bobby Allison (born 1937), former American NASCAR Winston Cup driver; named one of NASCAR's 50 greatest drivers
Bobby Andrews (born 1976), Filipino film actor
Bobby Ball (1944–2020), stage name of British comedian Robert Harper
Bobby Bare Country Music singer and songwriter
Bobby Beathard former NFL general manager
Bobby Berk, American interior designer and reality television personality
Bobby Bland (1930–2013), stage name of Robert Brooks, American blues singer, member of the Rock and Roll Hall of Fame
Bobby Blotzer (born 1958), drummer for the hard rock band Ratt
Bobby Bonds (1946–2003), American former Major League Baseball player, father of Barry Bonds
Bobby Bones (born 1980), radio personality and radio hall of fame member
Bobby Bonilla (born 1963), American former Major League Baseball player
Bobby Bradley (first baseman) Major League Baseball player
Bobby Bowden (1929–2021), American college football coach
Bobby Brink (born 2001), American ice hockey player
Bobby Brown (disambiguation), multiple people
Bobbie Bruce (1906–1978), Scottish footballer
Bobby Buntrock (1952–1974), American child actor
Bobby Burns (disambiguation), multiple people
Bobby Caldwell, American singer and songwriter
Bobby Cannavale, American actor
Bobby Cash, an Indian singer
Bobby Clarke (born 1949), Canadian former National Hockey League Hall-of-Fame player
Bobby Charlton (born 1937), English former footballer
Bobby Collier (1929–2000), American football player
Bobbie Comber (1886–1942), British comedian, singer and actor
Bobby Comstock (1941–2020), American rock and roll singer
Bobby Cox (born 1941), American former Major League Baseball player and manager
Bobby Cox (footballer) (1934–2010), Scottish footballer
Bobby Curtola (1943–2016), Canadian singer and teen idol
Bobby Dalbec (born 1995), American professional baseball player
Bobby Dall (born 1963), stage name of Robert Harry Kuykendall, American bass player for the hard rock band Poison
Bobby Darin (1936–1973), stage name of Walden Robert Cassotto, American singer, songwriter and actor 
Bobby Day (1930–1990), stage name of Robert Byrd, American singer
Bobby Davro, English actor and comedian born Robert Nankeville in 1958
Bobby Dodd (1908–1988), American college football Hall-of-Fame coach and player
Bobby Doerr (1918–2017), American former Major League Baseball Hall-of-Fame player 
Bobby Duncan (born 1945), Scottish footballer
Bobby Duncan (footballer, born 2001)
Bobby Driscoll (1937–1968), American child actor
Bobby Eaton (1958–2021), American professional wrestler
Bobby Farrelly (born 1958), American movie producer and director, one half of the Farrelly Brothers
Bobby Fischer (1943–2008), American chess grandmaster and 11th World Chess Champion
Bobby Fish (born 1976) American pro wrestler
Bobby Flay (born 1964), American celebrity chef, restaurateur and reality TV personality
Bobby Freeman (1940–2017), American R&B and soul singer, songwriter
Bobby Freeman (American football) (1932–2003), American National Football League player
Bobby Freeman (politician) (1934–2016), American lawyer and politician
Bobby Fresques, American football player
Bobbie Friberg da Cruz (born 1982), Swedish footballer
Bobby Fuller (1942–1966), American rock-and-roll singer, songwriter and guitarist
Bobby Goldsboro (born 1941), American singer
Bobby Gordon (1923–2001), Scottish footballer
Bobby Gordon (American football) (1935–1990), American football player
Bobbie Goulding (born 1972), English rugby league football coach and former player
Bobby Green (disambiguation), multiple people
Bobby Grich (born 1949), American former Major League Baseball player
Bobby Hackett (1915–1976), American jazz musician
Bobby Hamilton Jr. (born 1978), American race car driver
Sir Robert "Bobby" Bryson Hall II (born 1990), American rapper, singer, songwriter, record producer and author.
Bobby Hatfield (1940–2003), American singer, one half of the Righteous Brothers
Bobby Heenan (born 1944), American former professional wrestler, manager and announcer
Bobby Hebb (1938–2010), American R&B and soul singer
Bobby Helms (1933–1997), American country music singer
Bobby Higginson (born 1970), American Major League Baseball player 
Bobby Hill (disambiguation), multiple people
Bobby Hopkinson (born 1990), English footballer
Bobby Hull (1939–2023), Canadian former National Hockey League and World Hockey League player, member of the Hockey Hall of Fame
Bobby Hurley (born 1971), American former National Basketball Association player and college basketball head coach
Bobby Jenks (born 1981), American former Major League Baseball pitcher
Bobby Jindal (born 1971), American politician
Bobby Jones (golfer) (1902–1971), American golfer
Bobby Keck, former NASCAR Cup Series driver
Robert "Bobby" F. Kennedy (1925–1968), American politician
Bobby Knight (born 1940), American former college basketball coach
Bobby Labonte (born 1964), American race car driver
Bobby Lane (born 1939), American National Football League player
Bobby Lashley (born 1976), American professional wrestler and mixed martial artist
Bobby Layne (1926–1986), American National Football League quarterback
Bobby Lee American comedian
Bobby Lewis born 1925), American rock-and-roll and R&B singer
Bobby Ljunggren (born 1961), Swedish songwriter
Bobby Majors (born 1949), American former National Football League player
Bobby Massie (born 1989), American National Football League player
Bobby McFerrin (born 1950), American jazz singer
Bobby Mitchell (disambiguation)
Bobby Mitchell (born 1935), American former National Football League player and member of the Hall of Fame
Bobby Murcer (1946–2008), American former Major League Baseball player and broadcaster
Bobby Moore (disambiguation)
Bobby Moore (1941–1993), English footballer
Bobby Nalzaro (born 1963), Filipino journalist
Bobby Nasution (born 1991), Indonesian businessman and politician
Bobby Nichols (born 1936), former pro golfer
Bobby Nystrom (born 1952), Swedish-born Canadian former National Hockey League player
Bobby Ojeda (born 1957), American former Major League Baseball pitcher
Bobby Okereke (born 1996), American football player
Bobby Ologun, Nigerian-born television performer in Japan and mixed martial arts fighter, born Alaji Karim Ologun in 1973
Bobby Orr (born 1948), Canadian retired National Hockey League defenceman, member of the Hall of Fame
Bobby Pacquiao (born 1980), Filipino former professional boxer, younger brother of Manny Pacquiao
Bobby Pesavento (born 1979), American football player
Bobby Petrino (born 1961), American National Football League and college football coach
Bobby Pickett (1938–2007), American singer best known for co-writing and performing the novelty song "Monster Mash"
Bobby Portis American basketball player
Bobby Price (born 1998), American football player
Bobby Quarry (born 1962), American boxer, younger brother of boxer Jerry Quarry
Bobby Rahal (born 1953), American race car driver and owner
Bobby Reuse (born 1970), American professional sports car racing and stock car racing driver
Bobby Richardson (born 1935), American former Major League Baseball player
Bobby Richardson (American football) (born 1992), American National Football League player
Bobby Riggs (1918–1995), American tennis player
Bobby Robertson (1917–2009), American football player
Bobby Robson (1913–2009), English football player and manager
Bobby Roode (born 1977), Canadian professional wrestler
Bobby Ross former NFL and College football coach
Bobby Rydell, American singer born Robert Louis Ridarelli in 1942
Bobby Rush (born 1946), American politician
Bobby Rush (musician), American blues musician, composer and singer born Emmit Ellis Jr. in 1933
Bobby Sands (1954–1981), Provisional Irish Republican Army hunger striker and abstentionist MP in the United Kingdom Parliament
Bobby Seale (born 1936), American political activist, co-founder of the Black Panther Party
Bobby Short (1924–2005), American singer and pianist
Bobby Sherman (born 1943), American singer, teen idol and actor
Bobby Shmurda, stage name of American rapper Ackquille Jean Pollard (born 1994)
Bobby Smith (disambiguation)
Bobby Smith (rhythm and blues singer) (1936–2013), lead singer of the (Detroit) Spinners
Bobby Thigpen (born 1963), American former Major League Baseball relief pitcher
Bobby Thompson (disambiguation)
Bobby Thomson (disambiguation)
Bobby Thomson (1923–2010), Scottish-born American Major League Baseball player
Bobby Trendy (born 1979), American interior designer and reality television personality
Bobby Unser (1934–2021), American former racing driver
Bobby Valentine (born 1950), American former Major League Baseball player and manager
Bobby V (born 1980), stage name of American R&B singer Bobby Wilson
Bobby Van (1928–1980), stage name of American actor and game show host Robert Jack Stein
Bobby Vee (1943–2016), born Robert Velline, American singer and teen idol
Bobby Vinton (born 1935), American singer and songwriter
Bobby Wagner (born 1990), American National Football League linebacker
Bobbie Williams (born 1976), American former National Football League player
Bobbie Williams (rugby player) (c. 1886–1967), Welsh rugby union player
Bobby Williamson (born 1961), Scottish former footballer and current football manager
Bobby Williamson (footballer, born 1933) (1933–1990), Scottish football goalkeeper
Bobby Witt Jr. (born 2000), Major League Baseball player
Bobby Womack (1944–2014), American singer, songwriter, musician and producer
Bobby Wood (American football) (1916–1973), American National Football League player
Bobby Wood (soccer) (born 1992), American soccer player
Bobby Wayne Woods (1965–2009), American kidnapper, rapist and murderer
Bobby Z. drummer of The Revolution and formerly Prince
Bobby Zamora (born 1981), English footballer
Bobby (born 1995), rapper and member of k-pop group iKON

Female
Bobbie Battista (born 1952), American journalist and former newscaster
Bobby Darling, Indian actress
Bobbie Eakes (born 1961), American actress and singer
Bobbie Gentry (born 1942), stage name of Roberta Lee Streeter, American singer-songwriter 
Bobbie Irvine (1932–2004), British professional ballroom dancer and multiple world champion
 Esther Bobbie Heine Miller (1909–2016), South African tennis player
Bobbie Richardson (born 1949), American politician
 Fanny Bobbie Rosenfeld (1904–1969), Canadian multi-sport athlete, nicknamed "Bobbie" for her hairstyle
 Barbara Bobbie Sparrow (born 1935), Canadian former politician
Bobbie Jo Stinnett (1981–2004), American murder victim
 Roberta Bobbie Vaile (1959–1996), Australian astrophysicist

Fictional characters
 Bobby, a character in the Stephen Sondheim musical Company
 Bobby, a pigeon character from Animaniacs
 Roberta Bobbi Anderson, a character from the 1987 Stephen King novel The Tommyknockers
 Bobby Axelrod, a character in the Showtime series Billions
Bobby Baccalieri, a character in the HBO series The Sopranos
Bobby Beale, a character from the BBC soap opera EastEnders
 Bobby Bars, a character from A Bronx Tale
 Bobby Bolivia, a character in the film Transformers
Bobbie Jo Bradley, a character from the series Petticoat Junction
Bobby Brady, a character in The Brady Bunch
Bobby Breckinridge, a character in Degrassi
 Bobby Bond, best friend of King Kong on The King Kong Show 
 Bobby Boucher, lead character in the film The Waterboy
Bobby Caffey, from the TV series Third Watch
Bobby Cobb, in the TV series Cougartown
 Bobby Crocker from Kojak
 Bobby Dawson, a character from CSI: Crime Scene Investigation
 Bobby Dong, a character from the Nick show Game Shakers
 Bobby Drake, also known as Iceman, a character from Marvel Comics
 Bobbie Draper, a character from The Expanse
Bobby Donnell, a character in The Practice
Bobby Ewing, a character from the TV series Dallas
 Bobby Glover, a character in the TV series Little Bill
Robert Goren, a character in Law & Order: Criminal Intent also known as Bobby
 Bobby, a Scottish-accented human form of Bob from the Bubble Bobble video game series
 Bobby Grazzo, a character in the sitcom Vinnie & Bobby
 Bobby Green, the main character in the film We Own the Night
Bobby Hill, a character from King of the Hill
 Bobby Generic, the titular protagonist of Bobby's World
 Bobby Lupo, a character in the film Out for Justice
 Bobby Maine, a character in the film A Star is Born
 Bobby Mercer, main character in John Singleton's film Four Brothers
Bobby Munson, a character in Sons of Anarchy
 Bobby Nash, the main character in the series 9-1-1
Bobby Pendragon, the main character in the series Pendragon: Journal of an Adventure through Time and Space
 Bobby Prinze, main character from the film Scary Movie
 Bobby Proud, a character in The Proud Family
 Bobby Rayburn, a character in The Fan
Bobby Santiago, a character in The Loud House
 Bobby Shatford, a main character in the film The Perfect Storm
Bobby Simone, a character in NYPD Blue
Bobby Simpson, a character from the Australian soap opera Home and Away
Bobby Singer, a character in the TV series Supernatural
 Bobby Sixkiller, a character in the TV series Renegade
Bobbie Spencer, a character in the soap opera General Hospital
 Bobby Swift, a character in Cars 3
 Bobby Trench, the main character in 2 Guns
Bobby Wheeler, a character in the TV series Taxi
 Bobbie Wickham, a recurring character in the Jeeves and Mr Mulliner stories of P. G. Wodehouse
 Bobby Wilson, a character in Netflix's Julie and the Phantoms.
 Ricky Bobby, the main character in Talladega Nights: The Ballad of Ricky Bobby

See also
Bobby (disambiguation)
Bobby (surname)
Rob (given name)
Robbie

References

English masculine given names
English feminine given names
English unisex given names
English-language unisex given names
Unisex given names
Hypocorisms